Rainbow tunnel may refer to:

The Waldo Tunnel in Marin County, California
The Light Tunnel in the McNamara Terminal at the Detroit Metro Airport